New Found World is a history of Latin America written for children by Katherine Shippen and illustrated by C. B. Falls. It covers the Aztec, the Mayan and the Inca civilizations, the Conquistadors, the search for El Dorado, the coming of Christianity, and the struggle for independence of the colonial powers.  The book, illustrated by C. B. Falls, was first published in 1945 and was a Newbery Honor recipient in 1946.

References

1945 children's books
Children's history books
American children's books
Newbery Honor-winning works
Books about Latin America
Viking Press books